Vladimir Ukhov (21 January 1924 – 25 May 1996) was a Russian racewalking athlete who competed in the 1952 Summer Olympics. He was born in Saint Petersburg.

References

1924 births
1996 deaths
Athletes from Saint Petersburg
Russian male racewalkers
Soviet male racewalkers
Olympic athletes of the Soviet Union
Athletes (track and field) at the 1952 Summer Olympics
European Athletics Championships medalists